The 2000 Tour de France was the 87th edition of Tour de France, one of cycling's Grand Tours. The Tour began in Futuroscope with a prologue individual time trial on 1 July and Stage 11 occurred on 11 July with a hilly stage to Revel. The race finished on the Champs-Élysées in Paris on 23 July.

Stage 1
1 July 2000 — Futuroscope,  (individual time trial)

Stage 2
2 July 2000 — Futuroscope to Loudun,

Stage 3
3 July 2000 — Loudun to Nantes,

Stage 4
4 July 2000 — Nantes to Saint-Nazaire,  (team time trial)

Stage 5
5 July 2000 — Vannes to Vitré,

Stage 6
6 July 2000 — Vitré to Tours,

Stage 7
7 July 2000 — Tours to Limoges,

Stage 8
8 July 2000 — Limoges to Villeneuve-sur-Lot,

Stage 9
9 July 2000 — Agen to Dax,

Stage 10
10 July 2000 — Dax to Hautacam,

Stage 11
11 July 2000 — Bagnères-de-Bigorre to Revel,

References

2000 Tour de France
Tour de France stages